is a Japanese football player. She plays for Chifure AS Elfen Saitama. She played for Japan national team.

Club career
Azami was born in Higashimurayama on January 11, 1989. After graduating from high school, she joined Chifure AS Elfen Saitama in 2007. She also plays as midfielder.

National team career
On September 26, 2013, Azami debuted for Japan national team against Nigeria. She played 2 games for Japan until 2015.

National team statistics

References

External links

Japan Football Association

1989 births
Living people
Association football people from Tokyo
Japanese women's footballers
Japan women's international footballers
Nadeshiko League players
Chifure AS Elfen Saitama players
Women's association football defenders